Tivi Etok (born 1929 in Qirnituarjuq, Nunavik, Quebec) is an Inuit artist, illustrator, and printmaker. In 1975, he was the first Inuk printmaker to have a collection of his own prints released. He is now an Elder.

Early years
Etok was born in the camp of Qirnituartuq, near the community of Kangiqsualujjuaq, Nunavik, Quebec. His mother was Sarah, and he has a brother, Joe Willie. The family originated from the Tasiujaq region, later moving to the areas of Nachvak fiord in Labrador's Torngat Mountains, and the Koroc River area of Quebec's Ungava Bay watershed.

Career
Using sticks, Etok began drawing as a child.  His early drawings were of animals and villages, while his later work consisted of supernatural beings and illustrations of legends. After attending a print workshop in Puvirnituq, he learned how to earn money as a printmaker in the 1970s.

In 1967, he befriended anthropologist Donat Savoie who stayed with Etok and family while doing research for his masters thesis. The household included Etok, Sarah, and Joe, as well as Etok's wife, Susie (née Baron; 1939–2006) of Koroc River, and children, Minnie, Tomasi, Aatami, and Charlie. Etok and Savoie's friendship has lasted through the years, even after Savoie became a government official.

Later years

Now considered an Inuk Elder, a trilingual (Inuktitut, English and French) biography of Etok's life was written by Jobie Weetaluktuk, and published in Nunavik in 2008. The previous year, Scott Heyes' 2007 study entitled Inuit Knowledge and Perceptions of the Land-Water Interface, researched Kangiqsualujjuaq people, especially their knowledge and perceptions of their surroundings, and included Etok, plus three generations of his family.

References

Further reading
 Heyes, S. (2007). Inuit knowledge and perceptions of the land-water interface. Thesis (Ph.D.)--McGill University, Dept. of Geography, 2007. OCLC 277159992
 Weetaluktuk, J., Bryant, R., & Etok, T. (2008). Le monde de Tivi Etok: La vie et l'art d'un aîné inuit. Québec: Éditions MultiMondes.

External links
 Tivi Etok's biography on Inuit.uqam.ca
Photo, with Donat Savoie
 Photo, family members

1929 births
Living people
People from Nunavik
Inuit printmakers
Inuit illustrators
Artists from Quebec
20th-century Canadian printmakers
Canadian illustrators
Inuit from Quebec
Canadian male artists
20th-century Canadian male artists